Hastings Country Park was formed in 1974 and covers  east of Hastings in England. Sandstone cliffs, glens covered with gorse and trees, footpaths, nature trails, picnic areas and ample car parking are some of the features at the country park. Set in the High Weald Area of Outstanding Natural Beauty, it is also  a Local Nature Reserve as Hastings Country Park & Fairlight Place Farm. An area of  has been designated Hastings Cliffs Special Area of Conservation. Most of the park is in Hastings Cliffs to Pett Beach Site of Special Scientific Interest and it is also part of Hastings Cliffs Special Area of Conservation and Dungeness, Romney Marsh and Rye Bay Special Protection Area. Two areas in the park are Geological Conservation Review sites.

History
The park supported considerable human activity in prehistoric times. Archaeological finds and landmarks date from Palaeolithic, Mesolithic, Neolithic, Bronze Age, Iron Age, Romano-British, Saxon, Medieval, post-Medieval, Victorian to World War II periods.

A large majority of the park has been identified as an Area of Archaeological Interest, within which, a large area of the East Hill is a designated Ancient Monument.

Wildlife
Many rare and scarce liverworts, mosses and lichens occur within the ghylls or ravines. Peregrines, black redstarts and fulmars breed on the cliffs. Dartford warblers, stonechats and yellowhammers breed on the gorse-covered hillsides. Many migrants pass through the site in spring and autumn and usually include a few rarities such as Sardinian warbler, red-rumped swallow, and Pallas's leaf warbler, which have all occurred in recent years.

See also
 Fairlight
 Fairlight Glen
 Speckled Wood, Hastings

References

External links
Wild Hastings
Friends of Hastings Country Park

Country parks in East Sussex
Sites of Special Scientific Interest in East Sussex
Local Nature Reserves in East Sussex
Nature Conservation Review sites
Special Areas of Conservation in England
Country Park